Ardgarvan is a hamlet and townland in County Londonderry, Northern Ireland, 2 km south of Limavady. In the 2001 Census it had a population of 111 people. It is situated within Causeway Coast and Glens district.

The village has developed on the northern side of Ballyavelin Road and is dominated by public housing development. It has limited recreational facilities available to the local community.

See also 
List of villages in Northern Ireland
List of towns in Northern Ireland

References 

Villages in County Londonderry
Causeway Coast and Glens district